Brandon Logan Bender (born February 5, 1987) is an Italian-American mixed martial artist who competes in the Bantamweight and Featherweight divisions. A professional MMA competitor since 2006, Bender has fought in multiple promotions, including King of the Cage and Bellator Fighting Championships

Mixed martial arts career

FRUIT
Bender has trained in various martial arts. He began training in Tae Kwon Do from the age of seven. Bender also wrestled in high school and later, achieved a black belt in Brazilian jiu-jitsu. As of 2012, Bender trains at Aguirre Fighting Systems and Millennia MMA, alongside the likes of Charlie Valencia, Georgi Karakhanyan and Darrell Montague. Bender also spends time working at the UFC gym.

Early career
Bender began his professional career in the King of the Cage promotion in August 2006, claiming a unanimous decision victory after two rounds. He followed this up with a further win in December 2007, which was via triangle choke. Bender then joined the U.S. Navy Reserves, temporarily postponing his MMA career. Soon after, Bender changed his mind and wanted to return to MMA. He returned in March 2009 and won his next five fights via first round submission.

In March 2011, Bender then signed with Bellator Fighting Championships to face Josh Herrick at Bellator 35. Bender was taken down early on in the fight, but was able to stand back up and land a takedown of his own. Bender was able to secure a guillotine choke at 3:42 of the first round.

In February 2012, Bender fought Marlin Weiker at SCC 4. Throughout the fight, Bender attempted several guillotine chokes and other submission techniques, but was unable to finish the fight with any of them. After multiple attempts, Bender seemed to fatigue and appeared to be trailing on the scorecards according to some in attendance. Midway through the final round, however, Bender was finally able to complete a submission attempt, as he caught Weiker in a triangle choke.

In late-2011/early-2012, Bender started to gain more attention, as he was regarded as a promising prospect in the Featherweight division. He was named the #3 prospect in the division by Bloody Elbow and was featured on Sherdog.com's prospect watch feature. Despite this, in mid-2012, Bender announced plans to drop to the Bantamweight division. He signed with Tachi Palace Fights to fight at TPF 14 at bantamweight against Rolando Velasco. However, for unknown reasons, the bout never took place.

Mixed martial arts record

|-
| Loss
| align=center| 12–2
| Joshua Jones
| Decision (unanimous)
|Bellator 238
|
| align=center| 3
| align=center| 5:00
|Inglewood, California, United States
| 
|-
| Win
| align=center| 12–1
| Mario Navarro
| Submission (rear-naked choke)
| Bellator 116
| 
| align=center| 2
| align=center| 4:15
| Temecula, California, United States
| 
|-
| Loss
| align=center| 11–1
| Travis Marx
| TKO (knee to the body & punches)
| Bellator 100
| 
| align=center| 2
| align=center| 4:28
| Phoenix, Arizona, United States
| Bellator Season 9 Bantamweight Tournament Semifinal.
|-
| Win
| align=center| 11–0
| Jared Papazian
| Submission (rear-naked choke)
| National Fight Alliance: Valley Invasion 3
| 
| align=center| 1
| align=center| 2:01
| Woodland Hills, California, United States
|Bantamweight debut.
|-
| Win
| align=center| 10–0
| Geovanni Araujo
| Submission (arm-triangle choke)
| Gladiator Challenge: Star Wars
| 
| align=center| 1
| align=center| 1:10
| San Jacinto, California, United States
| 
|-
| Win
| align=center| 9–0
| Marlin Weikel 
| Submission (triangle choke)
| Superior Cage Combat 4: Grove vs. Silva
| 
| align=center| 3
| align=center| 2:30
| Las Vegas, Nevada, United States
| 
|-
| Win
| align=center| 8–0
| Josh Herrick
| Submission (guillotine choke)
| Bellator 35
| 
| align=center| 1
| align=center| 3:42
| Lemoore, California, United States
| 
|-
| Win
| align=center| 7–0
| Mike Palo 
| Submission (triangle choke)
| MEZ Sports: Pandemonium 3
| 
| align=center| 1
| align=center| 2:11
| Los Angeles, California, United States
| 
|-
| Win
| align=center| 6–0
| Isaac Gutierrez
| Submission (guillotine choke)
| BAMMA USA: Badbeat 1
| 
| align=center| 1
| align=center| 1:50
| Commerce, California, United States
| 
|-
| Win
| align=center| 5–0
| Jesse Newell
| Submission (rear-naked choke)
| CA Fight Syndicate: Throwdown at the Showdown 3
| 
| align=center| 1
| align=center| 1:16
| Santa Barbara, California, United States
| 
|-
| Win
| align=center| 4–0
| Tony Lopez
| Submission (rear-naked choke)
| Fight Circuit MMA: Victorious
| 
| align=center| 1
| align=center| 1:36
| Adelanto, California, United States
| 
|-
| Win
| align=center| 3–0
| Ryan Rother
| Submission (rear-naked choke)
| Colosseo Championship Fighting
| 
| align=center| 1
| align=center| 0:25
| Edmonton, Alberta, Canada
| 
|-
| Win
| align=center| 2–0
| Hugo Sandoval
| Submission (triangle choke)
| KOTC: Final Chapter
| 
| align=center| 1
| align=center| 1:37
| San Jacinto, California, United States
| 
|-
| Win
| align=center| 1–0
| Brian Whiteaker
| Decision (unanimous)
| KOTC: Rapid Fire
| 
| align=center| 2
| align=center| 5:00
| San Jacinto, California, United States
|

References

External links

Living people
Bantamweight mixed martial artists
Featherweight mixed martial artists
1987 births
People from Rancho Cucamonga, California